The Orange County Breakers are a World TeamTennis (WTT) franchise founded in 2003, owned by Laguna Beach businessman Eric Davidson. The Breakers won the WTT Championship in 2004, 2017 and 2021. In 2014, the franchise moved to Greater Austin, Texas, where it was known as the Austin Aces. On December 14, 2015, the Aces announced that the team would move back to Orange County, California for the 2016 season and be renamed the Orange County Breakers. In 2016, the Breakers played their home matches at Breakers Stadium at the Newport Beach Tennis Club. In 2017, the Breakers returned to playing at the Palisades Tennis Club, the venue where they played from 2003 to 2006.

Results
The Breakers raised the King Trophy in 2004, 2017 and 2021 as WTT Champions. The 2005, 2006 and 2016 Breakers reached the WTT Finals.

See also

 World TeamTennis

References

External links
 Official Team Website
 Tennisopolis Profile Page

World TeamTennis teams
Sports in Newport Beach, California
Tennis in California
Sports clubs established in 2003
Sports clubs disestablished in 2013
2003 establishments in California